Rizzotti is an Italian surname. Notable people with the surname include:

Maria Rizzotti (born 1953), Italian politician
Matt Rizzotti (born 1985), American baseball player
Alfredo Rizzotti (1909–1972), Brazilian artist
Jennifer Rizzotti (born 1974), American basketball player

See also
Rizzotto

Italian-language surnames